The British Journal of Cardiac Nursing is a monthly nursing journal which publishes original research and clinical articles relevant to the practice of cardiac nursing.

See also
 Portal:Nursing
 List of nursing journals

Publications established in 2006
Cardiology journals
Cardiac nursing journals